Hamden Hall Country Day School is a coeducational private day school in Hamden, Connecticut, educating students in preschool through grade 12. Hamden Hall was founded in 1912 as a country day school for boys by John P. Cushing, its first headmaster. It was the nation’s fourth country day school. The school has been coeducational since 1927 and expanded to include classes through grade 12 in 1934. Now split into three separate divisions, Hamden Hall enrolls the majority of its nearly 600 students in the upper and middle schools (Grades 7–12) and the remainder in the lower school (preschool through grade 6).

Tuition (2017–2018 school year) ranges from $17,000 in PreSchool to $39,825 in grades 9–12. Hamden Hall awards need-based financial aid to approximately 30 percent of its student body.

Hamden Hall is accredited by the New England Association of Schools and Colleges and is a member of National Association of Independent Schools and the Connecticut Association of Independent Schools.

School
The school year, from early September to early June, is divided into two semesters, with Thanksgiving, winter, and spring recesses and observances of several national and religious holidays.

Most classes are held five days a week, and extra-help sessions are incorporated into the schedule.

The Lower School (Grades Preschool through 6)
The World Language Program begins in preschool with instruction in Mandarin Chinese and continues through grade 1. Spanish is taught in grades 2 through 4, followed by Latin in grades 5 and 6. An extended-day program provides after-school enrichment for students.

The Middle School (Grades 7 through 8)
English classes emphasize classical authors while providing students with opportunities to produce their own creative and expository essays. Beginning in grade 7, students work regularly with faculty advisors.

The Upper School (Grades 9 through 12)
Students in the upper school carry 4 to 6 courses each semester, with the vast majority of students carrying 5 or 5.5 courses.

The upper school divides these required credits into four types of classes, based on academic proficiency required to succeed in the class: Skills (the lowest level), General, Honors, and Advanced Placement. Typically, math and science courses are offered in Skills, General, Honors, and AP levels. Multi-Variable Calculus, Linear Algebra, Organic Chemistry and Advanced Latin are offered at a level beyond the AP curriculum.

The upper school's music program includes a concert band and a jazz ensemble instrumentally.

Hamden Hall's theater program has been based in the Taylor Fine Arts Center since its construction in the late 1980s.  The Michael and Mary Jane Smith stage, named after Hamden Hall's long-standing theater faculty, has presented numerous productions.  The stage was dedicated in 2015 on the occasion of the Smiths' retirement.  Hamden Hall has housed a chapter of the International Thespian Society for several decades.

Faculty
85 full and part-time teachers
Three quarters of the faculty hold advanced degrees
Student / faculty ratio: 5 to 1
Average class size: 13

Campus
Hamden Hall was founded in 1912 by Dr. John P. Cushing and was housed in the hilltop mansion built by music merchant Morris Steinert. The mansion eventually exceeded its practical use and was taken down. The current campus consists of 8 major buildings.

The Cronin Administration Building houses the offices of the Head of School and the Director of the Lower School, with a faculty lounge on the first floor.

The Dolven Admissions Center, built around a Greek Revival house moved to the property, contains administrative and college counseling offices and a large art studio. In front of Dolven, a colorful display of the flags of 35 nations represents the nationalities and ethnic backgrounds of the school’s diverse student body.

The three-story Joseph & Esther Schiavone Science Center houses classrooms, facilities for science and the arts, middle and upper school computer labs, and the cafeteria known as the Lender Refectory.

The Taylor Performing Arts Center features a theater (with the Michael and Mary Jane Smith Stage) and a music suite.

The Taylor Gymnasium includes basketball, wrestling, and weight-training facilities.

Classrooms for the primary grades (pre-kindergarten - grade 3) are located in the Ethyle R. Alpert Building, while the upper elementary (grades 4-6), middle school (Grades 7-8), and upper school (grades 9-12) are housed in the 1972 Whitson Hall, named for former headmaster M. Jerry Whitson.

The Ellen & Charles Swain Library, built in 1983 and housing the Barbara Olin Taylor Learning Commons, features a collection of more than 25,000 volumes, 60 periodicals, and extensive reference resources. Swain is linked electronically to computer networks via the internet.

1.5 miles away, Hamden Hall operates the Beckerman Athletic Center, a 12.5 million-dollar facility that opened in 2010.  In Beckerman are gymnasia, swimming facilities, a weight and exercise room, sports injury resources, and an indoor running track, as well as a small computer lab and conference and study rooms.  The Hamden Hall golf team uses outside facilities, including the New Haven Country Club.

On July 16, 2019, the school announced the purchase of the historic Davis Street castle, built in 1906 and situated on 3.4 acres across the street, for $1.75 million. After a multimillion-dollar renovation, the 18,000 square foot acquisition will house the school's preschool through Grade 6 elementary program.

Sports

All students are required to participate in the athletic program.

Lower school students are involved in intramural teams and/or general physical education activities.

In the middle school, all students participate in either interscholastic or non-competitive athletic teams or activities, with the majority choosing the former. Athletics in the middle school are managed on a trimester system with all students participating in athletics all three terms.

In the upper school, the trimester system is again used. Upper school students must participate in only two trimesters per year of school, with mandatory participation in the fall trimester. All freshmen must participate in at least one team sport, the idea behind this being that participating in team sports in the first year of school will help build class unity for the remaining years.

In the middle and upper schools, interscholastic varsity teams are formed in football, soccer, wrestling, basketball, baseball, lacrosse, and tennis for boys; and field hockey, soccer, basketball, lacrosse, hockey, tennis, softball, and volleyball for girls. Cross-country, golf, and swimming squads are coeducational. Non-competitive athletics include weightlifting, yoga, Pilates, and Outdoors Club.  Some students participate in independent athletics for credit, which have ranged from martial arts to dancing.

Most Hamden Hall athletic teams compete under the umbrella of the New England Preparatory School Athletic Council, with some competing in specific leagues such as the Fairchester League.

Hamden Hall maintains two off-campus athletic facilities: a small, soccer-sized field directly adjacent to the main campus, and the  Skiff Street Athletic Complex  from campus. The latter contains some of the most highly regarded playing surfaces in the state, with fields and facilities for football, baseball, softball, soccer, lacrosse, field hockey, tennis, and cross country. The Hadelman Family Multipurpose Stadium, featuring a synthetic field, was dedicated in 2012. Also at this complex exists the Beckerman Athletic Center, dedicated in 2010. It is a US$12.5 million,  state-of-the art athletic building featuring 3 collegiate-length basketball courts (one wood, two composite), a 6 lane by 25-yard swimming pool, a large fitness center, conference rooms, and more. It has seating for up to 800 spectators.

Notable alumni

Michael Barbaro, reporter and host of The Daily (podcast)
 Hiram Bingham IV (1903–1988)), American diplomat and WWII hero
 Jonathan Brewster Bingham (1914–1986), Congressman and diplomat; US delegate to the United Nations General Assemblies 
 Chris Bruno, actor, USA Network series The Dead Zone and the movie The World's Fastest Indian
 Dylan Bruno, actor, CBS series Numb3rs and movie Saving Private Ryan
 Ross Douthat (born 1979), New York Times columnist and author 
 Len Fasano (born 1958), politician
 Mitch Feierstein, British-American investor, banker and writer 
 Gary Greenberg, lead co-writer of Jimmy Kimmel Live 
 Jake Hurwitz, comedian and member of the comedy duo Jake and Amir
Samantha Katz (born 1985), designer and arts entrepreneur
 Bun Lai, chef and owner of Miya's Sushi and a national leader in the sustainability movement 
 Jay Lender, writer and director of the animated TV series SpongeBob SquarePants
 Richard Wall Lyman, educator and president of Stanford University from 1970 to 1980
 Jill Medvedow,  director of the Institute of Contemporary Art, Boston
Carlos Parra (born 1977), soccer player  
 Benjamin Spock, doctor and author of the child-rearing guide "Baby and Child Care" and esteemed pediatrician 
 Josh Zeid (born 1987), Major League Baseball pitcher (Houston Astros)

References

External links 
 

Buildings and structures in Hamden, Connecticut
Schools in New Haven County, Connecticut
Educational institutions established in 1912
Private high schools in Connecticut
Private middle schools in Connecticut
Private elementary schools in Connecticut
1912 establishments in Connecticut